Badger is an unincorporated community located in Tulare County in California at an elevation of 3,038 feet. It has a population of 140. The zip code is 93603 and the area code 559. It is normally reached by California State Route 245.

Government

In the United States House of Representatives, Badger is in

Popular culture
The population was 15 at the time of filming this commercial.

History
In the 1970s and the 1980s, the controversial organization Synanon operated a residential compound on nearby Dry Creek Road. Badger was in the national news in October 1978 when the Los Angeles Police Department served a search warrant at this site in connection with a  deliberate rattlesnake attack on attorney Paul Morantz who was critical of the organization. An African-American Muslim community named Baladullah occupied the former Synanon site from 1989 through 2002. In 2020, the local newspaper reported that the former compound of the cult will become vacation rentals.

References

External links
 

Unincorporated communities in Tulare County, California
Unincorporated communities in California